Erica Kathleen "Kathy" Horvath (born August 25, 1965) is an American former professional tennis player. She is best known for upsetting world No. 1 Martina Navratilova in the fourth round of the 1983 French Open, delivering her only defeat for the season.

Career
She was the youngest player to play in the US Open in 1979 at 14 years and five days — this record still stands. Horvath was the youngest player to win the U.S. National 16 and under in 1979. She also is the only player to ever win all four age groups in the U.S. Girls Clay Courts in all consecutive years.

Horvath played on the WTA Tour from 1981 to 1989, winning six singles titles and reaching a career-high ranking of world No. 10 in 1984. She reached the quarterfinals at the French Open in 1983 and 1984. She retired with a 176–154 singles record.

Horvath was the only player to defeat Martina Navratilova in the 1983 season (at the French Open), winning in the fourth round in three sets. Navratilova's coaches (Renee Richards and Nancy Lieberman) argued in the stands over strategy, something Navratilova noticed during the match.

Horvath had career victories over Navratilova, Andrea Jaeger, Manuela Maleeva, Gabriela Sabatini, Dianne Fromholtz, Claudia Kohde-Kilsch, Mary Joe Fernández, Betty Stöve, and Sylvia Hanika. She was a member of the 1984 United States Fed Cup team. Horvath played in the 1984 Olympics when tennis was reintroduced as a demonstration sport and was the first seed. She was coached by Harry Hopman and Nick Bollettieri.

After her tennis career, she got her BS and MBA at the Wharton School of Business and then worked on Wall Street until 2003.

WTA career finals

Singles 9: (6–3)

Doubles 9: (3–6)

Grand Slam singles performance timeline

References

External links
 
 
 

1965 births
Living people
American female tennis players
French Open junior champions
Tennis players from Chicago
Grand Slam (tennis) champions in girls' singles
People from Millburn, New Jersey
21st-century American women